Success was an Australian prison ship, built in 1840 at Natmoo, Burma, for Cockerell & Co. of Calcutta. Between the 1890s and the 1930s, she was converted into a floating museum displaying relics of the convict era and purporting to represent the horrors of penal transportation in Great Britain and the United States of America. After extensive world tours she was destroyed in 1946 by fire while berthed in Lake Erie near Cleveland, Ohio.

Origins
Success was formerly a merchant ship of 621 tons, 117 feet 3 inches x 26 feet 8 inches x 22 feet 5 inches depth of hold, built in Natmoo, Tenasserim, Burma, in 1840.  After initially trading around the Indian subcontinent, she was sold to London owners and made three voyages with emigrants to Australia during the 1840s. On one of these voyages, following the intervention of Caroline Chisholm, Success sailed into Sydney town just the week before Christmas 1849 with families who had survived the Great Famine.

On 31 May 1852, Success arrived at Melbourne and the crew deserted to the gold-fields, this being the height of the Victorian gold rush. Due to an increase in crime, prisons were overflowing and the Government of Victoria purchased large sailing ships to be employed as prison hulks.  These included Success, Deborah, Sacramento and President.  In 1857 prisoners from Success murdered the Superintendent of Prisons John Price, the inspiration for the character Maurice Frere in Marcus Clarke's novel For the Term of His Natural Life.

In 1854 the ship was converted from a convict hulk into a stores vessel and anchored on the Yarra River, where she remained for the next 36 years.

Museum ship

In 1890, Success was purchased by a group of entrepreneurs to be refitted as a museum ship to travel the world advertising the perceived horrors of the convict era.  Although never a convict ship, Success was billed as one, her earlier history being amalgamated with those other ships of the same name including , which had been used in the original European settlement of Western Australia. She was incorrectly promoted as the oldest ship afloat, ahead of the 1797 .

A former prisoner, bushranger Harry Power, was employed as a guide for her first commercial season in Sydney Harbour in 1891. The display was not a commercial success, and her owners promptly abandoned their business venture and scuttled the ship in Kerosene Bay.

The following year the sunken Success was sold to a second group of entrepreneurs and refloated. After a thorough refit she was taken on tour to Brisbane, Adelaide, Hobart, and back to Sydney, then headed for England, arriving at Dungeness on 12 September 1894.

In 1912 she crossed the Atlantic and was exhibited as a convict museum along the eastern seaboard of the United States of America and later in ports on the Great Lakes. On April 22, 1915 the ship was docked in San Francisco CA for the Panama–Pacific International Exposition. While there a short film made by the Keystone Film Company called “Mabel and Fatty Viewing the World's Fair at San Francisco.” This film can be found in the Library of Congress collection. In this film the two stars go on board and the mayor of San Francisco James “Sunny Jim” Rolph, Jr. gives an extended tour of the ship. In 1917 she was briefly returned to commercial service as a cargo carrier. She sank after being holed by ice in January or February, 1918. She is listed as sunk by ice at Carrollton, Kentucky in January–February, 1918, in the March, 1918 issue of The American Marine Engineer magazine, Wrecksite lists 4 January 1919, at Wheeling, West Virginia. Refloated in 1918 she resumed her museum ship role. In 1933 was featured at the Chicago World Fair.

However, despite ongoing repairs Success was becoming rapidly unseaworthy. She was towed to Sandusky, Ohio, on Lake Erie, Ohio, to be dismantled and sold as scrap. A strong storm sank her at her moorings at Sandusky. A salvage operator named Walter Kolbe acquired the rights to her and in the summer of 1945 he had Success towed to nearby Port Clinton. Unable to enter the shallow port, she grounded just east of Port Clinton. On 4 July 1946 a fire broke out aboard Success, and in the course of the afternoon she burned to the waterline. Hundreds watched the blaze from the shoreline. The fire is generally attributed to unknown vandals. Remains of the ship remain in 16 feet of water just east of Port Clinton harbor.

The South Australian Maritime Museum holds a 1:60 full-hull model of Success.

References

Further reading
The History of the Convict Ship Success, and Dramatic Story of Some of the Success Prisoners. A Vivid Fragment of Penal History. c1912. 150 pp.
Bateson, Charles, The Convict Ships 1787-1868, Brown, Ferguson & Son, Glasgow, 1959
Wardle, Arthur C., Official History of the "Convict" Ship, Sea Breezes magazine, Vol. 3 (New Series, 1947), p 73–74.

External links

The History of the Convict Ship "Success" at Internet Archive   
Success (prison ship) at Flickr
Rich Norgard's page about the Success.
Rich Norgard's blog about the Success.
Success Article on the Success in Modern Mechanix (1930)
Ship Wrecks and Maritime Tales of the Lake Erie Coastal Trail Ship Wrecks and Maritime Tales of the Lake Erie Coastal Trail

Maritime history of Australia
Victorian-era ships of Australia
Defunct museums in Ohio
1840 ships
Merchant ships of Australia
Ships built in Myanmar
Museum ships
Prison museums in North America